U-122 may refer to one of the following German submarines:

 , a Type UE II submarine launched in 1917 and that served in World War I until surrendered on 26 November 1918; scuttled off the Isle of Wight on 1 July 1921
 During World War I, Germany also had this submarine with a similar name:
 , a Type UB III submarine launched in 1918 and surrendered on 24 November 1918; scuttled off the Isle of Wight on 1 July 1921
 , a Type IXB submarine that served in World War II until she went missing after 22 June 1940

Submarines of Germany